Scopula frigidaria is a moth of the family Geometridae. It was described by Heinrich Benno Möschler in 1869. It is found from Fennoscandia to the Kamchatka Peninsula and in northern North America, where it occurs across the boreal forest region, from Alaska across the Northwest Territories and Nunavut to Newfoundland, and in the mountains south to southern Wisconsin, Alberta and British Columbia.

Adults are on wing from late May to June in one generation per year.

The larvae feed on Vaccinium myrtillus. Larvae can be found from July to May. It overwinters in the larval stage.

Subspecies
Scopula frigidaria frigidaria
Scopula frigidaria schoyeni (Schneider, 1883) (Kola Peninsula, Fennoscandia)

References

External links

Moths described in 1869
frigidaria
Moths of Europe
Moths of North America
Insects of the Arctic